XDM, xdm, or similar can refer to:

Computing
 X display manager, a part of the X Window System architecture
 XDM (display manager), the default display manager included with the X Window System
 XDM (file format), the Extensible Device Metadata open format for including depth maps and other metadata in standard image files
 XQuery and XPath Data Model
 Cross-document messaging, that works around the limits set by the same origin policy in a web browser

Firearms
 Springfield Armory XD-M, a pistol series sold in the United States by Springfield Armory, Inc.

Gaming
 XDM: X-Treme Dungeon Mastery, a role-playing game supplement by Tracy Hickman, Curtis Hickman and Howard Tayler.